DWET-TV (channel 5) is a television station in Metro Manila, Philippines, serving as the flagship of the TV5 network. It is owned and operated by the network's namesake corporate parent through its licensee ABC Development Corporation; TV5 also provides certain services to One Sports flagship DWNB-TV (channel 41) under an airtime lease agreement with owner Nation Broadcasting Corporation. Both stations share studios at the TV5 Media Center, Reliance cor. Sheridan Sts., Brgy. Buayang Bato, Mandaluyong, Metro Manila, while DWET-TV's alternate studios and hybrid analog/digital transmitting facilities are located at the TV5 Complex, 762 Quirino Highway, Brgy. San Bartolome, Novaliches, Quezon City. The alternate digital transmitting facility is located at Block 3, Emerald Hills, Sumulong Highway, Antipolo, Rizal.

Digital television

Digital channels

UHF Channel 18 (497.143 MHz)1

UHF Channel 51 (695.143 MHz)2

Notes

1 – Permanent digital frequency assigned by NTC (through a Memorandum Circular).

2 – Licensed to Mediascape (Cignal TV), Inc.

Areas of coverage

Primary areas 
 Metro Manila 
 Cavite
 Bulacan
 Laguna
 Rizal

Secondary areas 
 Pampanga
 Nueva Ecija
 Tarlac
 Portion of Pangasinan
 Portion of Bataan
 Portion of Batangas
 Portion of Quezon

See also
 TV5
 One Sports
 One PH
 List of TV5 stations
 Radyo5 92.3 News FM

References

Television stations in Metro Manila
TV5 (Philippine TV network) stations
Television channels and stations established in 1960
Digital television stations in the Philippines